Manson is a 1973 documentary film by Robert Hendrickson and Laurence Merrick about American criminal and cult leader Charles Manson and his followers, known as "The Family". Narrated by Jess Pearson, the film explores the origins of Manson and his disciples, and the lead-up and events of the Tate–LaBianca murders. It was initially distributed by American International Pictures, with re-releases handled by Tobann International Films.

Content 
The film deals with the "Manson family" and has many interviews with the members of the group, including Charles Manson, "Squeaky" Fromme, and Sandra Good. It contains original footage of the Manson Family at their Spahn Ranch compound, Devil's Canyon, their Barker Ranch hideout in Death Valley, the Hall of Justice in Los Angeles and various other locations.

Post release 
When "Squeaky" Fromme attempted to assassinate President Gerald Ford, the Manson film was banned by United States district court Judge Thomas McBride in order to preserve Fromme's constitutional right to a fair and speedy trial. Robert Hendrickson's freedom of speech was thus set aside and the matter was taken by the ACLU to the Supreme Court.

Soundtrack music for the film was created by Brooks Poston and Paul Watkins, two former Manson associates. As well, music performed by the Manson Family can also be heard on the soundtrack.

Accolades
It was nominated for an Academy Award for Best Documentary Feature.

Home Video 

The film was released legitimately on VHS in 1987, but because of an alleged mafia plot Hendrickson spent much of the 1990s suing eBay for allowing bootleg dvd copies of the film to be released. The film has been released and sold in limited copies on DVD signed by Hendrickson on Amazon before his death in 2016.

In popular culture
The documentary was sampled by American nu metal band Slipknot. The band sampled part of an interview with Corey Hurst for their song "742617000027", which appears on the band's debut album Slipknot (1999). In the interview, Hurst says, "The whole thing, I think it's sick."

See also
 List of American films of 1973
 Hippie exploitation films
 Counterculture of the 1960s

References

External links
 Manson at AllMovie
 
 

1973 documentary films
1973 films
American documentary films
Documentary films about crime in the United States
Films directed by Robert Hendrickson
Cultural depictions of Charles Manson
1970s English-language films
1970s American films